Eleftheroupoli F.C., officially known as A.E. Eleftheroupoli (Athlitiki Enosi Eleftheroupoleos), the "Athletic Union of Eleftheroupoli", is a Greek association football club based in the city of Athens, Greece. The club currently competes in the Athens Second Division.

History
A.E. Eleftheroupoli is one of the oldest Greek sports clubs, established in 1929 by A. Neofytou, L. Dimitropoulos, A. Konstantinidis, N. Nikolaou, Ch. Theodorou, L. Konstantinidis, Th. Kiriakou, A. Nikolaou, G. Stefanidis, D. Kountouris, P. Tsakonas and P. Tevekelis. The club dominated in the national second division from the 1950s until the early 1960s. During the last twenty years, the club has decayed and nowadays they are playing in the lower Athens championships. In the years gone by the club brought out many players that were transferred to the higher rank football teams of Athens such as Stelios Skevofilakas, Panagiotidis, Giorgos Mageiras, Kountouris, Xenos, Mavridopoulos, Vlantis, Sevastiadis, Mitilinaios, Tryfon Tzanetis and others. In the last 20 years even though the club has had many economic problems they have managed to have a respectful presence in Athens football championships outstanding ethos and high competitive spirit.

Route
Success started early in 1933, a year which found Eleftheroupoli FC at the top of the action as the team managed to win the local municipality championships for the next three consecutive years (1933–1935) and was recognized by the court of Athens as an official club. The successes came one after the other and the team began to conquer territory in sporty feelings of local residents. 1937 was a year of innovation for the club as it was merged with a strong team called Hope of Nea Ionia chaired by S. Stavridis. With the continuous and untiring efforts of the 1939 board, the club was recognized by the Hellenic Football Federation and the Athens Football Clubs Association, while at the same time the team is competing in the Football League 2.

Stadium
The club's home ground was located in Nea Ionia, Athens. The municipal stadium of Nea Ionia is the home ground for A.E. Eleftheroupoli from the day of its foundation. It was built in 1962. In 2004 the whole stadium was extensively renovated and the pitch was replaced with a turf system of the very last generation. The dressing rooms were last renovated in 2007. The new facilities and stands built in 2015 were sponsored by the Greek government. The stadium is also used by A.O.Nea Ionia F.C and P.A.O. Alsoupolis. The main entrance of the stadium is located at Olympias street in Nea Ionia, Athens.

Honours and achievements

Domestic competitions
Beta Ethniki (Second Tier)
 Participation (2): 1961, 1962

Regional competitions
Athens FCA Third Division
  Winners (5): 1947, 1982, 1990, 1992, 2006

Personnel

Current Board

|}

References

External links
Official Website 
Facebook 

Association football clubs established in 1929
Football clubs in Athens
Football clubs in Attica
1929 establishments in Greece